Prado is a last name of Italian origin from the island of Sicily; variations of the last name include "Di Prado" and "Prato" 

Prado is ranked 2,358 out of 88,799 in the United States.

There are approximately 9,553 people with the surname Prado in Spain, making it the 490th-most-common in the country.

The name is commonly found in Italy, France, and Brazil.

About the origin of the last name, there are two known possible origins to the Prado surname (Italian and/or Spanish): The first one indicates the origin of the last name comes from Spain when the son of a noblewoman took the last name after the prado, Spanish word for field, where he was born. The last name is also said to have an Italian origin, more specifically from the Island of Sicily, where records have been found that indicate the presence of a noble family in the 16th century by the last name Prado. Prado comes from a variation of prato (the Italian word for field).

People
Edward C. Prado, a U.S. appeals court judge
Guilherme do Prado Raymundo, Brazilian professional football player
José Antônio de Almeida Prado (born 1943), Brazilian composer
Lelo Prado (born 1962), American college baseball coach
Leoncio Prado Gutiérrez, Peruvian mariner
Manuel Prado y Ugarteche, Peruvian politician
Mariana Prado (born 1982), Bolivian business administrator and politician
Mariano Ignacio Prado, President of Peru
Martín Prado, a Venezuelan baseball player
Miguelanxo Prado, a Galician (Spain) comic book creator
Paulo Silas do Prado Pereira, a former Brazilian football (soccer) player
Perez Prado, a Cuban bandleader 
Vasco Prado, Brazilian sculptor
Wagner Prado, a Brazilian mixed martial artist

 De Prado 
Antonio Pimentel de Prado y lo Bianco (1604-c. 1671-72), Spanish officer
Blas de Prado, or Del Prado, Spanish painter
Fernando de Prado (born 1963), Spanish historian, writer and lecturer
Francisco Pérez de Prado y Cuesta a (1677–1755), Spanish prelate of the Roman Catholic Church and Grand Inquisitor of Spain 
Guilherme de Almeida Prado, Brazilian film director
Juan Núñez de Prado (conquistador), a 16th-century Spanish conquistador  
Juan Núñez de Prado (Grand Master of Calatrava) (died 1355), ortoguese nobleman and  Master of the Order of Calatrava 
Julio Márquez de Prado Pérez (1948–2021), Spanish magistrate
Marcos Ramírez de Prado y Ovando (1592–1667), Roman Catholic prelate who served as Archbishop of Mexico 
Martha Bolaños de Prado (1897–1963), Guatemalan actor, musician, composer and educator
Mme de Prado, also known as Catherine Lacoste de Prado, French amateur golfer and the only player 
Nélida Bollini de Prado, a member of the Puccio family

See also
Prado (disambiguation)

References

Breton-language surnames
Spanish-language surnames